Patrick Subrémon (born 25 November 1947 in Saint-Laurent-d’Aigouze, Gard, Languedoc-Roussillon), is a French civil servant, prefect from 2000.

He is a graduate of Institut d'études politiques d'Aix-en-Provence in Aix-en-Provence, Bouches-du-Rhône, PACA.

Career 

Patrick Subrémon was from 1982 to 1984 chef de cabinet (principal private secretary) to Édith Cresson minister of Agriculture (1981–1983) and minister of Foreign Trade and Tourism (1983–1984). He is one of the persons behind the project Disneyland Paris. In January 1984, going with Édith Cresson, then minister of Foreign Trade and Tourism into United States, Patrick Subrémon met Ray Watson, president of Walt Disney Productions and Frank Stanek, promoter de Tokyo Disneyland et elaborates with them the general lines of the project of Disney in Europe.

Appointed sub-prefect en 1984, and prefect en 2000, he fulfilled several offices in prefectorial administration or in the Ministry of Interior. Especially he was prefect of Haute-Saône (2000–2003), of Allier (2003–2005)
of Eure-et-Loir (2005–2007)
and of Indre-et-Loire (2007–2009).

He is now inspecteur général de l'administration (inspector general of administration).

See also

References
  "Subrémon, Patrick, Edmond" (prefect, born in 1947), pages 2067–2068 in Who's Who in France : Dictionnaire biographique de personnalités françaises vivant en France et à l’étranger, et de personnalités étrangères résidant en France, 44th edition for 2013 édited in 2012, 2371 p., 31 cm,  .

Notes

Living people
1947 births
People from Gard
Sciences Po alumni
Prefects of France
Prefects of Haute-Saône
Prefects of Allier
Prefects of Eure-et-Loir
Prefects of Indre-et-Loire